Christian Schwarzenegger (born 11 November 1959 in Zürich) is a Swiss academic lawyer and professor of criminal law, criminal procedure and criminology at the University of Zurich.

He received his doctorate in 1992 and was admitted to the bar in the canton of Schaffhausen the following year. From 1994-99, he was Assistant Professor of European Law, Comparative Law, Criminal Law and Criminology, at the universities of Niigata and Aichi, in Japan.

Schwarzenegger's fields of research include family violence, cybercrime, homicide, abortion and end-of-life decisions (i.e. assisted suicide). He served as an expert for Swiss Television (SRF) in more than fifty crime documentaries.

Personal life
Schwarzenegger grew up in Zürich, the son of an Austrian musician and later engineer, who immigrated in the 1950s from Styria to Switzerland. Christian's father is a cousin of Arnold Schwarzenegger, making the two men second cousins.

References

External links
 Official website (in German)
Link to his publications in the catalog of the Deutschen Nationalbibliothek

1959 births
Living people
Academic staff of the University of Zurich
Swiss criminologists
Schwarzenegger family
Swiss people of Austrian descent